is a Japanese actor who is affiliated with Oscar Promotion. He graduated from the Nagasaki Institute of Applied Science University High School and then from the Department of Architecture in the Faculty of Engineering of the Nagasaki Institute of Applied Science.

Filmography

Television

Film

Stage shows

References

External links
 Profile at Beamie 
 

Japanese male actors
1974 births
Living people
People from Nagasaki
Actors from Nagasaki Prefecture